Aaron Takahashi is an American actor. He is best known for his roles as the "male nurse" Lee in the film Yes Man (2008), one of the fake groomsmen in The Wedding Ringer (2015), as Troy in the film Welcome to the Jungle (2013), and his various roles on the talk show Conan on TBS, with Conan O'Brien.

Takahashi has appeared in over 50 national commercials since 2004.

Early life
Takahashi graduated from North Torrance High School.

Takahashi worked at Meidi-Ya supermarket while attending the University of Southern California (USC). He graduated with a degree in English and an emphasis on creative writing. After graduation, he became the manager of the store. After the store closed, Takahashi pursued acting full time.

Career

Film
Takahashi has appeared as the character "Takashi" in Justin Lin's directorial debut, Better Luck Tomorrow (2002). He also appeared in the film Memoirs of a Geisha (2005) as a Rickshaw Runner, and in Lane Nishikawa's film Only the Brave (2006) as one of the 442 2nd Squad soldiers. Takahashi has additionally appeared as the male nurse character "Lee" in Peyton Reed's Yes Man opposite Jim Carrey. In 2013, Takahashi appeared as "Troy" in Rob Meltzer's Welcome to the Jungle (2013) opposite Jean-Claude Van Damme. In 2015, Takahashi appeared as Endo/Rambis (named after the coach Kurt Rambis), one of Josh Gad's character's "fake groomsmen" in Jeremy Garelick's The Wedding Ringer, starring Kevin Hart and Josh Gad.

In addition to Better Luck Tomorrow, Takahashi has appeared in independent films such as Kiyong Kim's Ku Klux Korena (2007) (as Jin), Teruhisa Yoshida's Robert Hearts Miss Ing (2008), Tom Huang's Why Am I Doing This? (2009)(as Sung), James Huang's Starting From Scratch (2013) (as Jim), Peter O'Melia's The Grounds (2014) (as Applicant #4), and as Aaron, a fictionalized version of himself, in Awesome Asian Bad Guys (2013-2014), directed by Patrick Epino and Stephen Dypiangco.

Takahashi has also appeared in various short films such as Mike Nojun Park's Re: Your Balls (2009) (as Matt), James Huang's Represent (2010) (as Aaron), and Roman Cortez's My Best Friend Bigfoot Ep.1 & 2. (2010) (as Scott).

Television
Takahashi has appeared in a number of TV series, including Asia Street Comedy (2004-2005) (various characters), Reno 911! (as a Thai Delivery Man and a Storeowner), The Bill Engvall Show (2009) (as a Driver), Whacked (as a Korean Shopkeeper), Traffic Light (as a Nerdy Dad), Mr. Sunshine (as Jerry), ACME Saturday Night (as various characters), Community (as the Math Club Leader in the episode "A Fistful of Paintballs" Dir. Joe Russo), The Mentalist (as Tai Nguyen), Ben and Kate (as Shawn), Sullivan & Son (as Dr. Park), The Big Bang Theory (as a scientist), The Millers (as Kevin), Conan (as various characters), Drunk History (as a guest) and Dog Park (as Neal).

Takahashi currently has recurring roles in both the Yahoo! Screen original series Sin City Saints (as social media guru Henry), and the USA Network series Mr. Robot (as Allsafe Security employee Lloyd).

Advertisement & other work
Takahashi has appeared in over 50 national ad campaigns for brands such as Snapple, the NFL, Esurance, McDonald's, Arlo Technologies and Amp'd Mobile (where he plays a worker that raps the song "U and Dat" (featuring T-Pain and Kandi Girl) out loud in a bathroom before another employee notice him). Takahashi also provides the voice of "Paul Tard" in the videogame Slumber Party Slaughterhouse: The Game (2008).

Takahashi has also appeared on stage in Paul Kikuchi's Slice, at the Fremont Theater in Pasadena.

He has been trained at East West Players, where he currently teaches the annual "On-Camera Commercial and Audition Class." He has also been a writer and performing member of the ACME Comedy Theater, and is also currently a workshop instructor and core performing member of the improv group Cold Tofu.

He was an honoree at East West Players 2019 Night Market for "advancing the visibility of Asian Americans nationally" through his work.

External links

Actor Aaron Takahashi's Greatest Hits
Angry Reader of the Week: Aaron Takahashi

References

American male actors of Japanese descent
American male film actors
American male television actors
American film actors of Asian descent
Living people
20th-century American male actors
21st-century American male actors
Year of birth missing (living people)